Aquapel is a rain repellent glass treatment created by PPG Industries. It is a competitor to the more widely known Rain-X product, but unlike Rain-X, is not a silicone-based compound. Aquapel Glass Treatment consists of fluorinated compounds called fluoroalkylsilanes which create a chemical bond with glass surfaces, causing water to bead up and roll off.

References

External links
Harvard's McCarroll Lab's Drop-Seq Page
Official website for the Aquapel product
Autoblog - Rain-X versus PPG Aquapel: Grudge Match (April 2006)
University of Michigan Study: The Influence of Hydrophobic Windshield Coating on Driver Visual Performance (July 1997)
Aquapel in Russia

Glass trademarks and brands
PPG Industries